NCRC can stand for:
 NGO Coordination and Resource Centre, coordinating group of post-tsunami relief
 National Council for the Revolutionary Command, the 20-man council set up to rule Syria in 1963
 Nebraska Central Railroad